Delaware City is a ghost town in Leavenworth County, Kansas, United States.

History
Delaware City was platted in 1854. A post office called Delaware City was established in 1856, and remained in operation until it was discontinued in 1878.

References

Geography of Leavenworth County, Kansas
Ghost towns in Kansas